is a former Japanese football player.

Playing career
Yamamura was born in Shizuoka Prefecture on July 12, 1974. After graduating from Shizuoka Gakuen High School, he joined Gamba Osaka in 1993. He played many matches as forward in 1994 and 1995. However he could not play at all in the match in 1996 and retired end of 1996 season.

Club statistics

References

External links

1973 births
Living people
Association football people from Shizuoka Prefecture
Japanese footballers
J1 League players
Gamba Osaka players
Association football forwards